Nogometni Klub Omladinac Mionica, commonly referred to as NK Omladinac Mionica or simply Omladinac Mionica, is a Bosnian football club from the town of Mionica near Gradačac, which currently plays in the Second League FBiH.

External links
NK Mramor Official website

Omladinac Mionica
Football clubs in Bosnia and Herzegovina
Omladinac Mionica